Raymond Ralph Watkins (January 10, 1903 – October 20, 1975) was a Canadian ice hockey player.

Watkins was a member of the Saskatoon Quakers who represented Canada at the 1934 World Ice Hockey Championships held in Milan, Italy where they won Gold.

See also
List of Canadian national ice hockey team rosters

References

1903 births
1975 deaths
Canadian ice hockey centres
Saskatoon Quakers players